KGTL (620 AM) is a radio station licensed to serve Homer, Alaska.  The station is owned by Peninsula Communications, Inc.  It airs a news/talk format.

The station was assigned these call letters by the U.S. Federal Communications Commission (FCC) on July 17, 1987.

The  price of electricity was increased by 47% in July 2008. In February 2009 KGTL applied for Special Temporary Authority from the FCC to operate with 2,500 watts full-time.

Translators

References

External links
 AM 620 the answer Facebook
 

GTL
News and talk radio stations in the United States
Radio stations established in 1987